François-Joseph Navez (16 November 1787 – 12 October 1869) was a Belgian neo-classical painter.

Biography

Navez was born in Charleroi. He was a pupil of Jacques-Louis David. He spent five years in Italy between 1817 and 1822.  Between 1835 and 1862 he was the director of the Académie Royale des Beaux-Arts in Brussels.

He was a very successful portrait painter. He also painted many mythological and historic subjects.

The orientalist painter Jean-François Portaels was his pupil (and son-in-law).

Jean Carolus, the Belgian painter of genre scenes and interiors, was a protege of François-Joseph Navez.

Navez was elected a fourth class member of the Royal Institute of the Netherlands in 1826, he became a supernumerary associate in 1841 and resigned in 1851. He died in 1869 in Brussels.

Main works
 1816 : Sainte Véronique de Milan, Museum of Fine Arts, Ghent.
 1816 : La Famille de Hemptinne, Royal Museums of Fine Arts of Belgium, Brussels, Belgium.Museum of Fine Arts, Ghent
 1819 : Scène de musique, Museum of Grenoble.
 1821 : Scène de brigands, Private collection.
 1829 : La Nymphe Salmacis et Hermaphrodite, Museum of Fine Arts, Ghent.
 1830 : Songe d'Athalie, Royal Museums of Fine Arts of Belgium, Brussels, Belgium.
 1831 : Portrait d'un jeune homme songeur  
1832 : Portrait of Theodore-Joseph Jonet and his two daughters, Groeningemuseum, Bruges.  

 1836 : Portrait de David, Montreal Museum of Fine Arts.
 1844 : Notre-Dame des Affligés, Chiesa di S. Antonio, a Charleroi.
 Trois Dames de Gand, Louvre, Paris.

Gallery

Sources
 P. & V. Berko, "Dictionary of Belgian painters born between 1750 & 1875", Knokke 1981, p. 488–489.
 P. & V. Berko, "19th Century European Virtuoso Painters", Knokke 2011, p. 511, illustrations p. 421.

References

External links
 

1787 births
1869 deaths
Artists from Charleroi
19th-century Belgian painters
19th-century Belgian male artists
Belgian neoclassical painters
19th-century painters of historical subjects
Pupils of Jacques-Louis David
Members of the Royal Academy of Belgium
Members of the Royal Netherlands Academy of Arts and Sciences
Burials at Laeken Cemetery
Academic staff of the Académie Royale des Beaux-Arts